Stuart Rome (born 1953 in Bridgeport, Connecticut) is an American artist photographer and professor of photography at Drexel University in Philadelphia, Pennsylvania.  He studied under John Pfahl while receiving his BFA from the Rochester Institute of Technology.  Stuart Rome also received an MFA from Arizona State University.

Rome's early work was color photography and focused substantially on third-world cultures and anthropology.  With more recent work, Rome has turned his attention to black and white landscape photography, pursuing specifically the spiritual relationships between human cultures and the landscape. His work has been collected by the Center for Creative Photography, Tucson, AZ; The Museum of Fine Arts, Houston, TX; the George Eastman House, Rochester, NY; the Los Angeles County Museum of Art, Los Angeles, CA; the Philadelphia Museum of Art, Philadelphia, PA; the Princeton University Art Museum, Princeton, NJ; and the San Francisco Museum of Modern Art, San, Francisco, CA.

Rome currently lives and works in Philadelphia, Pennsylvania.

Monograph
Forest, Nazraeli Press, 2005
"Signs and Wonders" southeast museum of photography in 2010

●

It was displayed in the art exhibition, "This is not an old Fall Out Boy song" in 2020

Grants
John Simon Guggenheim fellowship award. 2015
Pennsylvania Council on the Arts Grant in 1999
Artist in Residence, Manchester Craftsmen's Guild, Pittsburgh, PA in 1998
Artist in Residence, Blue Mountain Center, Blue Mountain Lake, NY in 1997
Visiting Artist and Juror for the National Photo Competition, The Magic Silver Show in 1997
Pennsylvania Council on the Arts Grant in 1992
Research Scholar Award, Drexel University in 1989
Materials Support Grant, Eastman Kodak in 1987
Materials Grant Award, The Polaroid Corporation in 1983
Artist in Residence, Syracuse University, Light Work Program, Syracuse, NY in 1978

External links
Gallery 339
Drexel University
stuartrome.com
Sepia.org
Luminous-lint.com
Stuart Rome on ArtNet
New York Times review of Stuart Rome

1953 births
Living people
Artists from Bridgeport, Connecticut
American photographers
Drexel University faculty